Events in the year 1866 in India.

Incumbents
Sir John Lawrence, Governor-General of India, 12 January 1864 – 12 January 1869
Colonel Edmund Haythorne, Adjutant-General of India, 22 June 1860–January 1866
Colonel Henry Errington Longden, Adjutant-General of India, January 1866–March 1869
Lord Napier, Governor of Madras, 1866-1872
Ram Singh II, Maharao of Kota State, 20 July 1828 – 27 March 1866
Chhatar Sal Singh II, Maharao of Kota State, 27 March 1866 – 11 June 1889
Sagramji II Devaji (Sagramji Bhanabhai), Thakur of Gondal State, 1851-14 December 1869
Bham Pratap Singh, Raja and Maharajah of Bijawar State, 23 November 1847 – 15 September 1899
Shri Singh, Raja of Chamba State, 1844-1870
Ranmalsinhji Amarsinhji, Raj Sahib of Dhrangadhra State, 9 April 1843 – 16 October 1869
Madan Pal, Maharaja of Karauli State, 4 March 1854 – 16 August 1869
Hiravajra Singh Deo, Maharajah of Patna, 1848-August 1866
Pratap Singh Deo, Maharajah of Patna, 1866-1878
Cecil Beadon, Lieutenant-Governor of Bengal, 1862-1866
Afzal ad-Dawlah, Asaf Jah V, Nizam of Hyderabad, 16 May 1857 – 26 February 1869
Robert Milman, consecrated bishop of Trichy-Tanjore Diocese of the Church of South India
Charles Pelly, revenue member of the Madras Legislative Council, 1862-1866
William Reierson Arbuthnot, member of the Madras Legislative Council, 1866-1870

Events
 East India Association, founded by Dadabhai Naoroji
47 million people were affected by the Orissa famine of 1866
Muhammad Qasim Nanotvi established the Darul Uloom Deoband on 31 May 1866, founding the Deobandi movement
Nanotvi founded Mazahir Uloom Saharanpur in November
Khursheed Ali Khan established Jamia-e-Imania on 15 December in Varanasi
Brahmoism split into the new Sadharan Brahmo Samaj sect
Allahabad High Court was established as the High Court of Judicature for the North-Western Provinces at Agra on 17 March
Naga Hills was given district status
British Indian administration established a post at Samaguting to end intertribal warfare and tribal raids on property and personnel in Nagaland
Government Victoria College, Palakkad was established in Kerala
Gossner Theological College Seminary was established in Jharkhand
St. Mary's Convent Inter College was established in Allahabad, Uttar Pradesh
Harish Chandra Postgraduate College opened on 1 April in Varanasi district, Uttar Pradesh
Christ Church College, Kanpur opened in Kanpur as part of the University of Calcutta
Bankim Chandra Chattopadhyay published Kapalkundala, a Bengali novel
Nandshankar Tuljashankar Mehta published Karan Ghelo in Gujarati
Edward John Waring published Pharmacopoeia of India
Bajaur Scouts were created
Scinde Dawk stamps, the first adhesive stamps used in Asia, were discontinued in June
British Raj acquired Dalhousie Cantonment and Bakloh for 5,000 rupees as a convalescent depot for European troops
Douglas Hamilton published Report on the High Ranges of the Annamullay Mountains in Madras
Commercial Bank of India of Bombay, founded in 1845, failed in the Panic of 1866
United Bank of India was established
Grand Chord and the Howrah–Delhi main line were opened, connecting Delhi and Kolkata while the Kalka Mail entered into service
Sahibganj loop was opened, connecting Khana Junction and Kiul Junction
Mughalsarai–Kanpur section was opened, connecting Mughalsarai Junction and Kanpur Central
Nasik Road railway station was opened in Nashik
Manmad Junction railway station was opened in Nashik
Khandwa Junction railway station was opened
Mathura–Vadodara section was opened
Barharwa Junction railway station was opened
Kanpur–Delhi section was opened, connecting Kanpur Central and Delhi
Mokama–Barauni section, connecting Mokama Junction and Barauni in Bihar
Ghaziabad railway station opened
Laksar Junction opened in Laksar, Uttarakhand
A supplement, the Pioneer Mail, consisting of "48 quarto-size pages," mostly of advertisements, was added to The Pioneer
, designed to carry troops between the United Kingdom and British India, is launched on 8 December
The meteorite Jamkheir fell in Maharashtra on 5 October
Madurai was constituted as a municipality.
Coimbatore was constituted as a municipality.
Machilipatnam Municipal Corporation was constituted as a municipality
Kumbakonam was constituted as a municipality
Indian soldiers were first allowed promotions beyond subedar

Law
Indian Post Office Act
India Military Funds Act 1866 was passed in the Parliament of the United Kingdom
Indian Prize Money Act 1866 was passed in the Parliament of the United Kingdom
Naval Discipline Act (British statute)
Straits Settlements Act (British statute)
The Third Pre-Independence Law Commission passed the Draft Contract Law
The Viceroy's Executive Council, Sir Henry Maine and Sir James Fitzjames Stephen, passed the Indian Companies Act
The Viceroy's Executive Council passed the Native Converts Marriage Dissolution Act 
The Viceroy's Executive Council passed the Trustees Act
The Viceroy's Executive Council passed the Trustees and Mortgage Powers Act
Calcutta Police Act, 1866 and the Calcutta Suburban Police Act, 1866 create the Kolkata Police Force
Order of the Star of India was expanded to three classes

Births
Gopal Krishna Gokhale, social and political leader in the Indian independence movement, on 9 May in Kothluk, Ratnagiri District, Bombay Presidency
Mahbub Ali Khan, Asaf Jah VI, Nizam of Hyderabad, on 17 August 1866 in Purani Haveli, Hyderabad
Sham Singh, Raja of Chamba State from 1873-1904
Raja of Panagal, zamindar of Kalahasti, born on 9 July
Khengarji III, Maharajah of Cutch State, born on 23 August
Syamadas Mukhopadhyaya, Indian mathematician who introduced the four-vertex theorem and Mukhopadhyaya's theorem in plane geometry, born on 22 June
Hiralal Sen, photographer who is generally considered one of India's first filmmakers

Deaths
Ram Singh II, Maharao of Kota State, on 27 March 1866
Hiravajra Singh Deo, Maharajah of Patna, August 1866
George Cotton, English educator and clergyman, known for his connections with British India and the public school system, on 6 October in Kushtia

References

 
India
Years of the 19th century in India